The 1986 Carson–Newman Eagles football team was an American football team that represented Carson–Newman College (renamed Carson–Newman University in 2012) as a member of the South Atlantic Conference (SAC) during the 1986 NAIA Division I football season. In its seventh year under head coach Ken Sparks, the team compiled a 12–1 record (6–1 against conference opponents), won the SAC championship, and defeated  in the Champion Bowl to win the NAIA national championship. 

It was the third of five national championships (1983, 1984, 1986, 1988, and 1989) won by Carson–Newman during the 1980s.

Schedule

References

Carson–Newman Eagles
Carson–Newman Eagles football seasons
NAIA Football National Champions
South Atlantic Conference football champion seasons
Carson–Newman Eagles football